Music in My Heart is a 1940 Columbia Pictures romantic musical starring Tony Martin and Rita Hayworth. Hayworth's first musical for the studio, the film was recognized with an Academy Award nomination for the song, "It's a Blue World", performed by Martin and Andre Kostelanetz and His Orchestra.

Production
Production on Music in My Heart (alternate title Passport to Happiness) began in October 1939. The film was released January 10, 1940.

Cast
Credits for Music in My Heart are listed in the AFI Catalog of Feature Films.
 Tony Martin as Robert Gregory 
 Rita Hayworth as Patricia O'Malley 
 Edith Fellows as Mary
 Alan Mowbray as Charles Gardner 
 Eric Blore as Griggs
 George Tobias as Sascha 
 Joseph Crehan as Mark C. Gilman 
 George Humbert as Luigi
 Joey Ray as Miller
 Don Brodie as Taxi Driver
 Julieta Novis as Leading Lady
 Eddie Kane as Blake
 Phil Tead as Marshall
 Marten Lamont as Barrett 
 Andre Kostelanetz and His Orchestra

Soundtrack
Chet Forrest and Bob Wright's original songs for Music in My Heart include "Oh What a Lovely Dream", "Punchinello", "I've Got Music in My Heart", "It's a Blue World" (a hit record for Tony Martin), "No Other Love" and "Hearts in the Sky". The film also features Ary Barroso's samba, "No Tabuleiro da Baiana", performed by Andre Kostelanetz and His Orchestra.

Accolades
"It's a Blue World", a song by Chet Forrest and Bob Wright, was nominated as Best Original Song at the 13th Academy Awards. The song is performed in the film by Tony Martin and Andre Kostelanetz and His Orchestra.

Reception
Film historian Clive Hirschhorn describes Music in My Heart as "a lightweight Irving Starr production" with "serviceable words and music" and "unremarkable direction".

Biographer Barbara Leaming characterized the film as one of the "dreadful mistakes" Columbia Pictures made with Rita Hayworth as the studio tried to figure out how to use her to advantage. Music in My Heart was one of five pictures Hayworth appeared in that year, none of which caught on with the public.

Reviewing the 2004 DVD release, Turner Classic Movies called Music in My Heart "a fun, charming, and unpretentious little musical which illustrates very well what an ordinary Hollywood entertainment of 1940 was like. … In the end, it's Martin's voice and Hayworth's overall presence which makes this a nice little winner, though Eric Blore, Alan Mowbray and George Tobias provide solid support as always."

Home media
 2004: Columbia TriStar Home Entertainment, DVD.

References

External links 
 

 
 It's a Blue World by Tony Martin (Decca Records 2932B, 1939) at YouTube

1940s romantic musical films
1940 films
Columbia Pictures films
American black-and-white films
1940s English-language films
Films directed by Joseph Santley
American romantic musical films
1940s American films